Tres Ombúes - Pueblo Victoria is a barrio (neighbourhood or district) of Montevideo, Uruguay.

Public Transport 
In the district Three Ombues passes only a single bus in the neighborhood that is as follows: 524

See also 
 Barrios of Montevideo

Barrios of Montevideo